A transpoviron is a plasmid-like genetic element found in the genomes of giant DNA viruses.

They are linear DNA elements of approximately 7 kilobases that encompass six to eight protein encoding genes. Two of these genes are homologous to virophage genes. Transpovirons encode a superfamily 1 helicase, which encompasses an inactivated family B DNA polymerase domain. Homologs of this unique polymerase-helicase fusion protein are widespread in Polinton-Like Viruses (PLV). Based on the phylogenetic analysis of the helicase domain the discoverers of PLVs concluded that transpovirons evolved from PLV via the loss of several genes including those encoding the morphogenetic module proteins.

References

Mobile genetic elements